Arturo G. Álvarez (known as Arturo Alvarez ) is an international music producer, mastering engineer, A&R representative, and artist. Originally from Mexico City, Mexico, he currently resides in Los Angeles. He has multiple awards and has worked with finalists from Eurovision Song Contest, as well as his own independent works. He is a member of the National Academy of Recording Arts and Sciences.

In 2013, Alvarez produced the first solo album "End of Story" for Mexican pop star Karla Diaz of the all girl pop group Jeans. In 2013-2014, he also produced American actor Joey Lawrence from ABC's Family's Melissa & Joey, and Mexican soap-opera star  Elisa Vicedo  He has also produced for Mexican stars Gaby Ramirez and Juan Carlos Casasola, actor and rap artist Dash Mihok, and in-tandem with Grammy-winner and multi-platinum producer and mixer Myke Aaron.

In March 2016 Alvarez won two Global Music Awards, as a producer and in the Latin Music category, for the single "Fiesta" performed by artist Anais Salazar (a.k.a. Anais).  Salazar received the same Global Music Awards in tandem with Alvarez. 

Alvarez produced the 2016 Lety Lopez album ¨Cuando Ama Una Mujer¨ featuring composer and performer Erika Vidrio, who also composed many of the songs on the album.

In 2017 Alvarez released Joey Lawrence´s comeback record ¨Imagine¨.  The record release was proceeded by the release of the first single on the LP ¨Girl¨. The single was followed with the release of Side A of ¨Imagine¨, with Side B to be released at a later date. 

He specializes in recording and marketing artists for the international market, including Brazil, as well as the rest of Latin America and all of Europe. Arturo G Alvarez uses Analog recording as well as digital, and is noted for producing Pop rock, Rock music, Alternative rock, Hip hop, and Rap music, sometimes in multiple language editions including English, Spanish, Portuguese, Croatian, Bosnian, and Macedonian, among others.  Alvarez produced the record Blagoslov with producer Bruno Krajcar for Sony Austria and Croatia Records. He was an honorary performer at the Song Festival of Kastav in 2006 with Alen Vitasovic and Mario Battifiaca. He is featured on the 2011 album Istrael, recorded and produced by artist Bruno Krajcar, performing the single "Roza" in Spanish.

Early life and career
Arturo G. Alvarez started his career as a performer in 1994 when he was cast in Grease (musical) at the Hidalgo Theater in Mexico City by Julissa, the producer and adaptor of the musical. In 1999, Alvarez signed as exclusive artist of Sony Music Mexico, and released his first album Serenata.

Notes

References

Diaz Rodriguez, Oscar, 'Arturo Alvarez es un joven cantante que pretendero poner de moda las Serenatas', El Heraldo de Mexico, 28 August 2003, p3d.
Franklin, Jonathan, 'POPSTAR Produtor de Hollywood Lanca Grande Producao com Brasileiros', SBT World, Brazil, 11 June 2011
Franklin, Jonathan, 'Exclusivo! Produtor de sucesso fala com o SBT World', SBT World, Brazil, February 18, 2011.
'Gaby Ramirez iniciara la grabacion de su disco debut', TVNotas, USA, 17 August 2011.
'Popstar Exclusivo Directo de Hollywood  Bastidores da Entrevista com os produtores Arturo Alvarez e Myke Aaron para David LaFontaine', SBT World, Brazil, 23 February 2011.
'Gaby Ramirez lanza su primer disco ineddito en ingles', Enel Brasero, Mexico, 19 August 2011.
'Cansonfest ugostio legende i meksickog pjevaca', Novilist, Croatia, 26 August 2006.
Granovic, Susana. 'Pjesme Bruno Krajcara za Meksicku publiku', Glas Istre, Croatia, 10 June 2009.
Natasa. 'Snimit cu duet Brunom Krajcarom', Glas Istre, Croatia, August 2005.
Kocijan, I. 'Meksikanac na Festivalu cakavske sansone', Glas Istre, Croatia, August 2006.
Natasa. 'Zuijezdza Alvarez cita Metro', Metro, Croatia, August 2006.
Kocijan, Ivana. 'Artur Alvarez Festival ucinio', Glas Istre, Croatia, August 2006.
Brezac, S. 'Putovanje Kroz Istru Artura Alvarez', Glas Istre, Croatia, August 2006.
Urelavic, N. 'Pjevac i zvijezda mekgickih saponica Arturo Alvarez u Istri', Glas Istre, Croatia, August 2005.
Morales Valentin, Emilio. 'Debutara Arturo Alvarez con una serenata sin mariachi', El Universal, Mexico, August 2000.
Morain Monroy, Enrique. 'La Nueva Estrella Que Mexico Esperaba', Impacto, Mexico, September 2000.
Riano, Mario E. 'Descubrimiento de Jolissa, Arturo inicia Carrera Promisoria', El Sol de Mexico, Mexico, September 1996.
Ariza, Nuria. 'Yolanda Miranda Mama de Thalia manejara proyecto con Arturo Alvarez un cantante que se llama El Elvis Mexicano', TVNotas, USA, August 2003.
'Dash Mihok Apoyando Arturo Alvarez y Anuncio de su visita a Brasil', NME Online Magazine, 13 March 2012.
Izmejena, Zadnja. 'Klapa Cambi, Klapa Su. Petar U Sumi, Arturo Alvarez, Tamburasi iz Heiki-Humani Tarni Koncert´, Udruga Heiki, 2 September 2006.
'Karla Diaz de Jeans lanza disco de exitos...', "Las Noticias Mexico", Mexico, 6 September 2013.

'Nuevo disco de Elisa Vicedo: SuperStar Wig', Starmedia.com, 22 July 2013.

'Whoa!" Joey Lawrence Talks About Return To Music', The Queen Latifah Show, 9 June 2014.

'Celebra Elisa Vicedo 17 años, con su primer material discográfico', Yahoo noticias, Netimex, US & Mexico, 22 July 2013.

'Karla Diaz lança single e clipe de "Tell Me"', Mundo Positivo, 12 August 2013.

'Joey Lawrence to premiere new single girl on July 18, listen here', July 17, 2017.

'Joey Lawrence confirms throwback photo shoot with mayim bialik says blossom reboot is possible', The Insider, August 22, 2017.

'Joey Lawrence wants his new throwback album to put a smile on your face', Bustle, July 20, 2017.

Mexican record producers
Hip hop record producers
A&R people
Croatian-language singers
Mexican emigrants to the United States
Portuguese-language singers of Mexico
Mexican pop singers
Living people
Year of birth missing (living people)